Minxinjiayuan station is a station on Line 10 of Chongqing Rail Transit in Chongqing municipality, China. It is located in Yubei District and opened in 2017.

References

Railway stations in Chongqing
Railway stations in China opened in 2017
Chongqing Rail Transit stations